"5 Women" is a song recorded by American musician Prince. It was released as the second promotional single from his twenty-second studio album The Vault: Old Friends 4 Sale (1999). It was issued in 1999 as a CD single, exclusively in Germany, receiving radio airplay in addition to the CD. Prince solely wrote and produced it, while a series of individuals provided various instrumentation for the track.

Unlike Prince's previous material, "5 Women" primarily takes influence from blues music, instead of his traditional funk material. Joe Cocker, an English musician, released the track under "Five Women" for his 1991 studio album Night Calls before Prince released his version of it.

Background and release 
In July 1999, Prince announced the upcoming release of The Vault: Old Friends 4 Sale, a collection of previously unreleased material from his partnership with Warner Bros. Records. The material created was recorded throughout 1985 and 1996, and was promoted by the release of one single, "Extraordinary", on August 10, 1999.

Track listing

Credits and personnel 
Credits adapted from The Vault: Old Friends 4 Sale liner notes

 Prince – vocals, lyrics, production, instruments
 Michael B. – drums
 Brian Gallagher – tenor saxophone
 Kathy J. – baritone saxophone
 Dave Jensen – trumpet

 Michael Nelson – trombone
 Levi Seacer, Jr. – guitar
 Steve Strand – trumpet
 Sonny T. – bass guitar

References 

1999 songs
Prince (musician) songs
Song recordings produced by Prince (musician)
Songs written by Prince (musician)